Great Western Bank may refer to:

 Great Western Bank (1919–1997), defunct bank headquartered in California
 Great Western Bank (1907–2022), bank headquartered in South Dakota